Snookball is a ball sport that is played on a billiard table, combining elements of snooker and association football.

History

In 2014, snookball was founded by Frenchmen Aurélien Deshayes and Samuel Dreher.

References

2010s fads and trends
2014 establishments in France
Association football variants
Sports originating in France